The 13 Most Terrifying Horror Stories by R.S. Hadji, is a list of horror (short) stories that was published in  Rod Serling's The Twilight Zone Magazine  in the July-August 1983 edition.

The list

References

Horror short stories